Don't Tell: The Sexual Abuse of Boys, originally released in French as Ça arrive aussi aux garçons: l'abus sexuel au masculin, is a nonfiction book by Michel Dorais (FR). It was published in 1997 in French by VLB (FR). It was later republished by Typo éditeur. The English translation was published by McGill-Queen's University Press in 2002, and Isabel Denholm Meyer was the translator.

The book has testimonials from thirty sexual abuse victims from Canada.

Manon Toupin of La Nouvelle Union stated the English version of the book was very successful in Canada and the United States.

The translator of the English version had a son who was a sexual abuse victim while he was a child; the man committed suicide at age 29.

References
 Grondin, Anne-Marie. "YOUTH VICTIMS, COMPETENT AGENTS: A SECOND OPINION ON SEXUAL VICTIMIZATION TRAUMA" (Archive). International Journal of Child, Youth and Family Studies (2011) 3 & 4: 450–472.
 Meyer, Isabel Denholm. "Translator's Preface." In: Dorais, Michel. Don't Tell, Second Edition: The Sexual Abuse of Boys. McGill-Queen's Press - MQUP, March 5, 2002. , 9780773575363.

Notes

Further reading
 Gagné, Frédérick (author). Langlois, Simon (Editor). "Michel Dorais, Ça arrive aussi aux garçons, Montréal, Typo essai, 2008, 311 p" - In: Recherches sociographiques (FR), 2009, Vol.50(3), pp. 672–674 [Peer Reviewed Journal].   ; E- .

External links
  "COMMUNIQUÉ Ça arrive aussi aux garçons. L'abus sexuel au masculin DE MICHEL DORAIS" (Archive). Typo éditeur. 22 January 2008.

1997 non-fiction books
Canadian non-fiction books
Child sexual abuse in Canada
Sociology books
Books about child abuse